In mathematics, especially in algebraic geometry, the Beilinson regulator is the Chern class map from algebraic K-theory to Deligne cohomology:

Here, X is a complex smooth projective variety, for example. It is named after Alexander Beilinson. The Beilinson regulator features in Beilinson's conjecture on special values of L-functions.

The Dirichlet regulator map (used in the proof of Dirichlet's unit theorem) for the ring of integers  of a number field F

is a particular case of the Beilinson regulator. (As usual,  runs over all complex embeddings of F, where conjugate embeddings are considered equivalent.) Up to a factor 2, the Beilinson regulator is also generalization of the Borel regulator.

References 
 

Algebraic geometry
Algebraic K-theory